This article provides details of international football games played by the Indonesia women's national football team from 2010 to 2019.

Results

2010

2011

2013

2015

2018

2019

References

2010s in Indonesian sport
Indonesia women's national football team results